Keigley Branch Bridge is a historic structure located northeast of Gilbert, Iowa, United States. The Iowa State Highway Commission was re-formed in 1913 and they developed standard designs for smaller bridges. One of their designs was an alternative to the Luten arch. They were built throughout the state in the 1910s and 1920s. This is the oldest remaining arch bridge from that era. The Koss Construction Company of Des Moines completed it in 1913 for $3,384.85. The bridge features a medium-span arch with concrete-filled spandrels, paneled guardrails, a corbeled arch ring, and two-tone concrete detailing. The Keigley Branch Bridge was listed on the National Register of Historic Places in 1998.

See also

List of bridges documented by the Historic American Engineering Record in Iowa
List of bridges on the National Register of Historic Places in Iowa
National Register of Historic Places listings in Jones County, Iowa

References

External links

Bridges completed in 1913
Bridges in Story County, Iowa
Historic American Engineering Record in Iowa
National Register of Historic Places in Story County, Iowa
Road bridges on the National Register of Historic Places in Iowa
Arch bridges in Iowa
Concrete bridges in the United States